The Wave is a sandstone rock formation located in Arizona, United States, near its northern border with Utah. The formation is situated on the slopes of the Coyote Buttes in the Paria Canyon-Vermilion Cliffs Wilderness of the Colorado Plateau. The area is administered by the Bureau of Land Management (BLM) at the Grand Staircase–Escalante National Monument visitor center in Kanab, Utah.

The formation is well-known among hikers and photographers for its colorful, undulating forms and the difficult hike required to reach it. Due to the fragile nature of the formation and the large number of people wishing to visit it, a daily lottery system is used to dispense permits for up to 16 people and/or 4 groups (whichever comes first) two days before (visitors must apply within a geofence area encompassing the greater Kanab visitor center, Vermilian Cliffs, and Page areas). Additionally, 48 people and/or 12 groups (whichever comes first) online permits for each date are available four months in advance of a planned trip. A map and information about the hike are supplied to those who have obtained permits.

Geology
The Wave consists of intersecting U-shaped troughs that have been eroded into Navajo Sandstone of Jurassic age. Initially, infrequent runoff eroded these troughs along joints within the Navajo Sandstone. After their formation, the drainage basin, which fed rainwater to these troughs, shrank to the point that the runoff became insufficient to contribute to the cutting of these troughs. As a result, the troughs are now almost exclusively eroded by wind, as indicated by the orientation of erosional steps and risers cut into the sandstone along their steep walls. These erosional steps and risers are oriented relative to the predominant direction of the wind as it is now naturally funneled into and through these troughs.

The Wave exposes large-scale sets of cross-bedded eolian sandstone composed of rhythmic and cyclic alternating grainflow and windripple laminae. The rhythmic and cyclic alternating laminae represent periodic changes in the prevailing winds during the Jurassic period as large sand dunes migrated across a sandy desert. The thin ridges and ribbing seen within The Wave are the result of the differential erosion of rhythmic and cyclic alternating grainflow and windripple laminae within the Navajo Sandstone. These laminae have differing resistance to erosion as they have been differentially cemented according to variations in the grain size of the sand composing them. The soft sandstone is fragile, especially the ridges and ribbing of The Wave. As a result, visitors must walk carefully to avoid breaking the small ridges.

In some areas The Wave exposes deformed laminae within the Navajo Sandstone. These laminae were deformed prior to the lithification of the sand to form sandstone. Judging from their physical characteristics, this deformation likely represents the trampling and churning of these sands by dinosaurs after their deposition. Dinosaur tracks and the fossil burrows of desert-dwelling arthropods, such as beetles and other insects, have been found in the Navajo Sandstone within the North Coyote Buttes Wilderness Area.

Artistic significance

An ideal time to photograph The Wave is the few hours around midday when there are no shadows in the center, although early morning and late afternoon shadows can also make for dramatic photos. After a rain storm, numerous pools form which can contain hundreds of tadpole shrimps (Lepidurus apus). These pools can be present for several days.

Above and slightly west of The Wave is what many call "the Second Wave", or "the middle Wave", which has fainter colors but is still of interest to most visitors and photographers. Hugo Martin from the Los Angeles Times said, "You can't call yourself a landscape photographer if you haven't snapped a photo or two of the Wave."

Access policy
The Wave is located within the Paria Canyon-Vermilion Cliffs Wilderness. This wilderness is administered by the Bureau of Land Management (BLM), part of the United States Department of the Interior. A day-use permit from BLM is required to visit The Wave.

BLM limits access to the North Coyote Buttes Wilderness Area to just 64 permits per day. 48 of the permits are available in advance by an online lottery conducted four months before the month for which the permit is sought.  The remaining 16 permits are made available by geofenced daily lottery two day's before one's intended hike. The legacy walk-in lottery has transitioned to the new Daily Lottery. While within the geofence area on a mobile device this lottery is only available by going to Recreation.gov in your browser or by installing the Recreation.gov app. Spring and autumn are the most popular times of year to visit, but the popularity of The Wave is such that the chances of obtaining a permit by either advance lottery or the day-before lottery are much less than 50% from March through November.  The Wave is particularly well known among European tourists, partly because it appeared in the German documentary film Fascinating Nature (1996) and a compilation called Faszination Natur – Seven Seasons (2004).

Access trails
There are four trailheads which provide access to Paria Canyon and The Wave. However, in an effort to maintain the natural integrity of the region, there are no formal trails or signage to guide hikers to The Wave from any of the trailheads.  The White House trailhead is the main entrance, and the one most commonly used. The Buckskin Gulch and Wire Pass trailheads offer more experienced hikers access to Buckskin Gulch, the main tributary of Paria Canyon. The Lee's Ferry trailhead, located at the lower end of Paria Canyon is the normal exit point for hikers traveling the entire length of the canyon.

During and after a storm the road may be impassable, even with a four-wheel-drive vehicle. The Wire Pass Trailhead includes a wide parking lot with restrooms, but no water. It is also accessible from the Arizona side by taking U.S. Route 89A from Jacob Lake on the Kaibab Plateau toward Navajo Bridge, turning north onto the House Rock Valley Road, after descending from the Kaibab. This is a longer access route over dirt road than from the Utah side.

Although this is the shortest route, it is also a slightly more challenging hike than several of the other available routes. Temperatures in this area typically climb above  in the summer, so it is best to start the hike early. Anyone attempting the hike in any season is wise to be prepared for harsh desert conditions, including fierce winds, blowing sand, and little shade.

The Wave can be challenging to locate due to the lack of an established, marked trail. Hikers must choose their own route across the open desert, which requires traversing exposed sandstone, sand dunes, and sandy wash bottoms. A formal guide sheet for navigating to The Wave is now provided to every permitted hiker by the BLM.  The guide is designed for use with compass, GPS, or visual navigation. There are six checkpoints each for the outbound hike to The Wave and the return to the trailhead. Each checkpoint includes a marked color photo of the terrain ahead, azimuth, latitude, longitude, UTM, northing, and easting. Visitors are well advised to closely study the guide sheet before starting their hike.

While not required, the Bureau of Land Management provides a list of authorized guides for those hikers who may be uncomfortable in a wilderness situation.

References

External links

 BLM permit site  – Lottery permit process for The Wave
 The Wave Photography – In LA Times
 Spherical panoramas of The Wave – Coyote Buttes
 The Wave Website – information about The Wave, AZ
 GNIS data
   
   
   
   

Landforms of Coconino County, Arizona
Rock formations of Arizona
Geologic formations with imbedded sand dunes
Geologic formations of Arizona